Landfall: A Channel Story is a novel by Nevil Shute. It was first published in England in 1940 by Heinemann.

The story is set during the opening months of the Second World War and it concerns a young pilot, Roderick 'Jerry' Chambers, who is part of an air patrol unit guarding the southern coast of England – around Portsmouth. One day, Chambers sees a submarine and, believing it to be German, attacks with his weaponry and bombs. The submarine is sunk.

Back at the base, it is revealed that the sunken submarine was, in fact, a British vessel. Chambers escapes discipline but is censured and posted far away to the north of England. Meanwhile, by a curious chain of coincidences, his love interest, Mona Stevens (a local barmaid), discovers that the submarine was, in truth, a German vessel – it having previously attacked and sunk the missing British sub that Chambers was accused of sinking.

Chambers is offered a chance to redeem himself in a dangerous mission to test a new marine attack system. His plane explodes in mid-air but he survives, and manages to make his report. The novel ends with his transfer, as an instructor, to a pilot training school in Ontario with Mona, now his wife.

Adaptations
The novel was adapted to film in 1949. Landfall starred Michael Denison and was directed by Ken Annakin.

Notes
The novel was reviewed by George Orwell for New Statesman magazine on 7 December 1940.

The mistaken bombing of a British submarine by a British plane may be taken from a real incident. During the Second World War, HMS Snapper was bombed by an unidentified plane off the Dutch coast, narrowly surviving. The same day, a British pilot reported sinking a German U-boat in the same area. Confusion persists as to whether they were the same submarine and plane in both reports. John Anderson wrote in an April 2006 Nevil Shute Foundation newsletter, "The more I delve into this the more convinced I am that Shute got to hear about the Snapper incident and adapted it into the plot for Landfall".

References

External links
 

1940 British novels
Novels by Nevil Shute
Novels set during World War II
Novels set in Hampshire
Aviation novels
Heinemann (publisher) books
British novels adapted into films